Grozești is a village in Nisporeni District, Moldova. Right across the Prut river, which separates Moldova from Romania, is located the Romanian village of the same name.

Notable people
Dimitrie Bogos (1889-1946), politician, mayor of Chișinău 
Vlad Plahotniuc, politician and businessman

References

Villages of Nisporeni District
Populated places on the Prut
Kishinyovsky Uyezd
Lăpușna County (Romania)